Dr. Mohsin Maghiana (Urdu: ڈاکٹر محسن مگھیانہ) (born 1 January 1956) is a Pakistani physician, writer, columnist and humorist. He is mostly recognized by his literary and humorous works.

He was born as Niaz Ali Ahmad Khan Mighiana (Urdu: نیاز علی احمد خان مگھیانہ) in the city of Jhang, Pakistan. During his high school education, he decided to write his own poetry and chose Mohsin (Urdu: محسن) as his takhallus or pen name. He couldn't become a poet but he went on using Mohsin as his pen name in his literary works during school and made it officially part of his name before going to college which resulted in Niaz Ali Mohsin Mighiana (Urdu: نیاز علی محسن مگھیانہ) as his full name. However, on his literary works, his name appears as Dr. Mohsin Maghiana.

Personal life 

He was born in a middle-class farmer family of Jhang in 1956 on the first day of the year. He was the first child of Meher Sher Muhammad to cross infancy. He writes on first page of his autobiography that he had an elder sister who died a few days after birth.

He took his medical degree from Faisalabad Medical College in 1981. Since then he has worked in many different medical institutes and hospitals around Punjab. He has unsuccessfully tried to pass Foreign Medical Graduate Examination in Medical Sciences in United States. He took his master's degree in surgery in 1988 after a few unsuccessful attempts.

He is currently running his private medical centre in Jhang with the name of Mighiana Medicare. Alongside his own medical centre he works as a surgeon in D.H.Q. Hospital, Jhang.

Literary works 
His first attempt to rise to mainstream Urdu literature was in 1994 when he wrote a humorous autobiography titled Anokha Laadla. As he was almost unknown among literary circles of Urdu at that time, he sent parts of his book to very famous to mildly famous personalities, most of whom were Urdu and Punjabi writers except for Ghulam Ishaq Khan (former president of Pakistan), and asked them for their reviews. He admits in the preface of this book that some personalities refused to write any reviews but he never reveals how many they were. He has added all the reviews to the book which take 61 pages out of its 418 pages (almost 14%), which is quite odd even for a new writer. To date, three editions of Anokha Laadla have been published in 1994, 1997 and 2003.

He is one of very few Pakistani writers who became famous by writing an autobiography, despite not being already well-known. Other prominent examples are Qudrat Ullah Shahab and Col. Muhammad Khan, however, Mighiana has not achieved that kind of fame which was earned by Shahab and Khan.

His other works are as follows:

Book Written on Dr.Mohsin Mighiana

Translation of Dr.Mohsin Mighiana

Research work on Dr.Mohsin Mighiana

References

Punjabi people
Pakistani humorists
Pakistani surgeons
People from Jhang District
Urdu-language humorists
Living people
1956 births